Hatomim was a scholarly journal published by the Chabad-Lubavitch Hasidic movement. The journal was published under the direction of the sixth Rebbe of Chabad, Rabbi Yosef Yitzchak Schneersohn. The journal published articles on Chabad philosophy and Talmud.

History
Hatomim was the first Hasidic publication to publish a photograph of a Hasidic Rebbe. The first was a portrait-photograph of Rabbi Yosef Yitzchak Schneersohn, the sixth Chabad Rebbe. It was published in a 1936 edition marking the Rebbe's liberation from Soviet imprisonment.

Editors 
The editors-in-chief of Hatomim were:
Rabbi Yechezkal Faigen, Chassidism
Rabbi Yehuda Eber, Talmud
Rabbi Shmuel Zalmanov, General editor

The seventh Chabad Rebbe, Rabbi Menachem Mendel Schneerson, was also involved in editing the journal.

Publication 
The journal ran from 1935 to 1938 and a collection of Hatomim was later reprinted in book form by the central Chabad publishing house, Kehot Publication Society. Editions of Hatomim include:
Kfar Chabad, Israel (1971)
Brooklyn, New York (1975)

References

External links
 Article on Hatomim at Chabadpedia.co.il
 Hatomim available on HebrewBooks.org

Chabad-Lubavitch texts
Publications established in 1935
Publications disestablished in 1938
Multilingual journals
Judaic studies journals